The Medal "For the Return of Crimea" is a Russian campaign medal of the Ministry of Defense of the Russian Federation. The existence of the awards was also confirmed by Yaroslav Roshchupkin, an employee of the Central Military press service.

The medal was awarded to military and civilian personnel of the Armed Forces of the Russian Federation for services and distinction displayed during the Annexation of Crimea by the Russian Federation, the March 16, 2014 Crimean status referendum, and the entry of Crimea into the Russian Federation as the result of the referendum. The medal can also be awarded to other citizens of the Russian Federation and to foreign citizens for assistance in solving the tasks assigned to the Armed Forces of the Russian Federation relating to these security measures taken in the Crimea. 

As it can be seen at the photo of the reverse side of the medal Russian Defense Ministry has clearly indicated the term of the campaign: February 20 — March 18, 2014. Official date of the beginning of the "Return of Crimea" operation appears February 20 when Viktor Yanukovych was still in office as Ukraine's head of state. In fact, only the next day President Yanukovych left Kyiv, and it was already 22 February 2014 when the Parliament of Ukraine adopted the Resolution "On the dissociation of the President of Ukraine from fulfillment of constitutional powers and appointment of early presidential elections in Ukraine", used by Russia as a pretext for accusations of the alleged "unconstitutional coup in Ukraine". The fact that Crimea started its "return" to Russia two days before Yanukovych's removal from power and his resignation from the post of the President of Ukraine can be considered as an indirect proof that Russia launched its operation against Ukraine of seizing the Crimean peninsula on February 20, 2014.

Similar medals 
A similar medal, "For the Liberation of the Crimea" was awarded to Chechen president Ramzan Kadyrov and Krasnodar Krai governor Aleksandr Tkachyov, as well as the Night Wolves leader Alexander Zaldostanov for "helping Crimeans to achieve self-determination".

There is also a  awarded by the Russian governor of Crimea.

It was widely reported in the media when a 'Crimea medal' was to be put on auction in Moscow on April 13, 2019 by Igor Strelkov, a Russian former militant commander involved in the wars in Ukraine. This medal was however not the one described above, but one made by a private initiative.

References

External links
 

Orders, decorations, and medals of Russia
Annexation of Crimea by the Russian Federation
Military awards and decorations of Russia
Awards established in 2014
2014 establishments in Russia